Eagle Field  is a privately owned, private use airport in Fresno County, California, United States. It is located seven nautical miles (8 mi, 13 km) southwest of the central business district of Dos Palos, a city in neighboring Merced County.

History
It was first activated on June 24, 1943 as United States Army Air Forces primary (level 1) pilot training airfield known as Dos Palos Airport. It was assigned to the USAAF West Coast Training Center (later Western Flying Training Command), operated under contract by Coast Aviation Corp. The airport had three turf runways, aligned 00/18 (1,900 feet); 09/27 (1,900 feet), and 13/31 (2,300 feet). It had several satellite airfields in the local area for emergency and overflow landings.
 Hammond Auxiliary Field (location undetermined)
 Vail Auxiliary Field
 Dos Palos Emergency Field
 Canal Field Auxiliary Field
 Mason Auxiliary Field

Flying training was performed with Ryan PT-22s as the primary trainer. Also had several PT-17 Stearmans and a few P-40 Warhawks assigned. It was inactivated on December 28, 1944 with the drawdown of AAFTC's pilot training program and was declared surplus and turned over to the Army Corps of Engineers.

The base was then used as an aircraft storage depot for excess USAAF training aircraft, having UC-78s, PT-17s, Vultee BT-13/15, and AT-6 Texans. Eventually it was discharged to the War Assets Administration (WAA) and is now from time to time used as a crop dusting airfield. After the war, the City of Dos Palos briefly operated a golf course on the site before the property reverted to the federal government. In 1980 it was put up for auction.

Eagle Field was in a short scene of the movie Indiana Jones and the Kingdom of the Crystal Skull.

Central California Historical Military Museum
Later on it became home of the Central California Historical Military Museum, which continues to operate at the field. The museum is also known as Eagle Field AAF – WWII Living History and Military Museum.  Many wartime buildings remain at the airfield which is open to the public.

Facilities and aircraft 
Eagle Field covers an area of 127 acres (51 ha) at an elevation of 153 feet (47 m) above mean sea level. It has one runway designated 12/30 with an asphalt surface measuring 2,300 by 60 feet (701 x 18 m). There are 8 aircraft based at this airport: 6 single-engine, 1 multi-engine, and 1 jet.

See also

 California World War II Army Airfields
 35th Flying Training Wing (World War II)

References

Other sources
 
 Manning, Thomas A. (2005), History of Air Education and Training Command, 1942–2002.  Office of History and Research, Headquarters, AETC, Randolph AFB, Texas 
 Shaw, Frederick J. (2004), Locating Air Force Base Sites, History’s Legacy, Air Force History and Museums Program, United States Air Force, Washington DC.

External links
 Eagle Field at Central California Historical Military Museum
 Aerial image as of August 1998 from USGS The National Map
 

Airports in Fresno County, California
Museums in Fresno County, California
Aerospace museums in California
Military and war museums in California
1943 establishments in California
Airfields of the United States Army Air Forces in California
USAAF Contract Flying School Airfields
Airports established in 1943
USAAF Western Flying Training Command
American Theater of World War II